In differential geometry and gauge theory, the Atiyah–Hitchin–Singer theorem, introduced by ,  states that the space of SU(2) anti self dual Yang–Mills fields on a 4-sphere with index k > 0 has dimension 8k – 3.

References

Differential geometry